Hepatocystis carpenteri is a species of parasitic protozoa. They are transmitted by flies of the genus Culicoides and infect mammals.

Taxonomy
This species was described by Miltgen et al. in 1980.

Distribution
This species is found in Gabon.

Description
The intrahepatic schizonts (maximum ) are larger than those of other species and the cyst wall has a spongy appearance which appears to be unique.

It must be distinguished from Hepatocystis epomophori and Hepatocystis brosseti.

Hosts
This species is known to infect the hammer-headed bat (Hypsignathus monstrosus).

References

Parasites of Diptera
Culicoides
Parasites of bats
Haemosporida